Buceros is a genus of large Asian hornbills (family Bucerotidae).

Description
Hornbills in the genus Buceros include some of the largest arboreal hornbills in the world, with the largest being the great hornbill. All the hornbills in this genus have a large and hollow bony casque on their upper beak that can be useful to scientists and bird watchers to recognise their age, sex and species. Their wingspan can be up to 1.8 meters (6 foot) and they have the largest wingspan out of all the hornbills.

Taxonomy
The genus Buceros was introduced in 1758 by the Swedish naturalist Carl Linnaeus in the tenth edition of his Systema Naturae. The name is from Latin becerus meaning "horned like an ox" which in turn is from the Ancient Greek boukerōs  which combines bous meaning "ox" with kerōs meaning "horn". The type species was designated as the rhinoceros hornbill (Buceros rhinoceros) by Daniel Giraud Elliot in 1882.

Species
The genus contains three species:

The helmeted hornbill is sometimes included in this genus, but today most authorities place it in the monotypic Rhinoplax instead.

References

 Kemp, A. C. (2001). Family Bucerotidae (Hornbills). pp. 436–523 in: del Hoyo, J., Elliott, A., & Sargatal, J. eds. (2001). Handbook of the Birds of the World. Vol. 6. Mousebirds to Hornbills. Lynx Edicions, Barcelona. 

 
Bird genera